Carlephyton is a genus of four species in the family Araceae, all endemic to Madagascar.

Description
The species in this genus are seasonally dormant tubers. The leaves are cordate with a sub-marginal collective vein. The fine venation is reticulate. There are usually one to three leaves. The petiole sheath is short. Inflorescences are typical aroids with a spathe and spadix. It has no sterile appendix and its flowers, usually one to three, are unisexual. The spathe is not constricted and the lower part is persistent in anthesis. The berries tend to be orange-red.

Habitat
They are known to grow in tropical deciduous forests on limestone or basalt or in rock crevices.

Species
Four species are accepted:
Carlephyton darainense 
Carlephyton diegonse 
Carlephyton glaucophyllum 
Carlephyton madagascariense

References

 Kew World Checklist of Selected Plant Families
 Simon J. Mayo, Josef Bogner, Peter C. Boyce: The Genera of Araceae. 1. published, Royal Botanic Gardens/ Kew Publishing, London 1997,  (Full-text as PDF-file; Continental Printing, Belgium 1997).
 
 Protolog: Jum. 1919. Ann. Inst. Bot.-Géol. Colon. Marseille., III, 7: 187
 Bogner, J. 1972. Revision der Arophyteae (Araceae). Bot. Jahrb.. 92: 1-63
 Bogner, J. 1975. Aracées. Flore de Madagascar et des Comores. 31e. famille: 75 pp.

External links 
Network Araceae
Relevant page in CATE Araceae
Aroid
GBIF

Aroideae
Araceae genera
Endemic flora of Madagascar